The 1985 NSL Cup was the ninth season of the NSL Cup, which was the main national association football knockout cup competition in Australia. All 24 NSL teams from around Australia entered the competition, as well as a further 8 from various state leagues around Australia.

Bracket

First round

Round of 16

Quarter-finals

Semi-finals

Final

References

NSL Cup
1985 in Australian soccer
NSL Cup seasons